Federated States of Micronesia participated at the 2018 Summer Youth Olympics in Buenos Aires, Argentina from 6 October to 18 October 2018.

Athletics

Wrestling

References

You
Nations at the 2018 Summer Youth Olympics
Federated States of Micronesia at the Youth Olympics